Baborów  is a town in Gmina Baborów, Głubczyce County, Opole Voivodeship, southern Poland. Baborów lies on the river .

History
The first mention of the town comes from 1296 in which a wójt Jarosław is mentioned. The town was most likely founded by a Bohemian magnate, Bavor (Babor). Later it was part of an independent duchy, Habsburg-ruled Bohemia, the Kingdom of Prussia and from 1871 and 1945 also Germany. After the defeat of Nazi Germany in World War II it became part of Poland. It was granted town rights before 1340, although deprived of them from 1575 to 1718. In the 18th century, Baborów belonged to the tax inspection region of Prudnik.

According to the German census of 1890, the town had a population of 2,707, of which 2,220 (82%) were Czechs. It marked the 19th-century linguistic border between German, Polish, and Czech.

During World War II, the town, then known as Bauerwitz, was the base for two working parties (E288 and E398) of British and Commonwealth prisoners of war, under the administration of the German Stalag VIII-B/344 POW camp at Łambinowice (then known as Lamsdorf). In January 1945, as the Soviet armies resumed their offensive and advanced from the east, the prisoners were marched by the Germans westward in the so-called Long March or Death March. Many of them died from the bitter cold and exhaustion. The lucky ones got far enough to the west to be liberated by the allied armies after some four months of travelling on foot in appalling conditions. The town's German population was interned in Łambinowice camp, and expelled.

Notable people
  (1946–2019), Polish geographer and politician, member of the Polish Sejm.

International relations

Twin towns – sister cities
See twin towns of Gmina Baborów.

Gallery

References

External links

  

Cities and towns in Opole Voivodeship
Cities in Silesia
Głubczyce County